Kilgoris Constituency is an electoral constituency in Narok County, Kenya. It is one of six constituencies in  the county. It used to be the only constituency in the former Trans Mara District. The constituency was established for the 1997 elections. The constituency has 18 wards, all electing councillors for the Trans Mara County Council.

The towns of Kilgoris, Emarti and Lolgorian are located in this constituency.

Members of Parliament 

2022 KENYA GENERAL ELECTION - KANU PARTY - JULIUS LEKAKENY SUNKULI

Locations and wards

References 

Constituencies in Narok County
Constituencies in Rift Valley Province
1997 establishments in Kenya
Constituencies established in 1997